Bill Bauer is an American football coach. He served as the head football coach at Sterling College in Sterling, Kansas for three seasons, from 1994 to 1996, compiling a record 7–23.

Head coaching record

References

Year of birth missing (living people)
Living people
Sterling Warriors football coaches